Stepankovo is a rural locality (a selo) in Lyakhovskoye Rural Settlement, Melenkovsky District, Vladimir Oblast, Russia. The population was 59 as of 2010. There are 3 streets.

Geography 
Stepankovo is located on the Dubrovka River, 19 km east of Melenki (the district's administrative centre) by road. Fursovo is the nearest rural locality.

References 

Rural localities in Melenkovsky District